Wendson dos Santos Lopes (born 22 August 1997), simply known as Wendson, is a Brazilian footballer who plays as a forward for Volta Redonda RJ.

Club career
Born in São Pedro da Aldeia, Rio de Janeiro, Wendson represented Arraial do Cabo and Sampaio Corrêa-RJ as a youth. He made his senior debut with the latter on 25 May 2019, in a 0–0 Campeonato Carioca Série B1 home draw against Goytacaz.

Wendson started the 2020 campaign on loan at Rio Branco de Venda Nova, but subsequently returned to his parent club and helped the side in their promotion to the Campeonato Carioca; Rio Branco also won the Campeonato Capixaba later on. On 21 February 2021, after impressing in the first stage of the 2021 Carioca, he moved to Ferroviário also in a temporary deal.

On 27 May 2021, Wendson moved to Série A side Ceará on loan until December 2022. He made his debut in the category three days later, coming on as a late substitute for Rick in a 3–2 home success over Grêmio.

Career statistics

Honours
Rio Branco de Venda Nova
Campeonato Capixaba: 2020

References

External links
Ceará profile 

1997 births
Living people
Sportspeople from Rio de Janeiro (state)
Brazilian footballers
Association football forwards
Campeonato Brasileiro Série A players
Sampaio Corrêa Futebol e Esporte players
Ferroviário Atlético Clube (CE) players
Ceará Sporting Club players